Caldwell Hall may refer to:

In the United States

Caldwell Hall (Catholic University of America), a residence hall
Caldwell Hall (Pine Bluff, Arkansas), listed on the NRHP in Arkansas
Caldwell Hall (Georgia Tech), a residence hall at the Georgia Institute of Technology
Caldwell Hall (Ithaca, New York), listed on the NRHP in New York
Caldwell Hall (Abilene, Texas), listed on the NRHP in Texas

Architectural disambiguation pages